Campeonato San Juanino de hockey sobre patines (San Juan Roller Hockey Championship) is the state Roller Hockey Clubs Championship in San Juan, Argentina. The best ranked teams in each season qualifies to Liga Nacional Argentina A-1. In 2015, 7 of 14 teams in Liga A-1 were from San Juan.

Records

List of Winners

Titles by Team

References

External links

Argentina websites
Liga Nacional Official Website
Cofederation Argentina de Patin
Diario de Cuyo
Bochin Stick
Canal 4 San Juan

International
 Roller Hockey links worldwide
 Mundook-World Roller Hockey
rink-hockey-news - World Roller Hockey

Roller hockey in Argentina
Roller hockey competitions in Argentina